The  was a professional wrestling championship created by Amon Tsurumi. The champion was forced to wrestle exclusively in dark matches on DDT shows. Contrary to regular professional wrestling championships, the title was not rewarded to the winner of the match, but was given to the loser instead.

Title history

List of combined reigns
In the context of this title rules, a defense means a loss.

See also

Dramatic Dream Team
Professional wrestling in Japan

References

DDT Pro-Wrestling championships